In knot theory, prime knots are those knots that are indecomposable under the operation of knot sum.  The prime knots with ten or fewer crossings are listed here for quick comparison of their properties and varied naming schemes.

Table of prime knots

Six or fewer crossings

Seven crossings

Eight crossings

Nine crossings

Ten crossings

Higher

Conway knot 11n34
Kinoshita–Terasaka knot 11n42

Table of prime links

Seven or fewer crossings

Higher

See also 
 List of knots
 List of mathematical knots and links
 Knot tabulation
 (−2,3,7) pretzel knot

Notes

External links

"KnotInfo", Indiana.edu.

Knot theory
Mathematics-related lists